The Eye Of The Eagle is an album by Dave Bainbridge and Dave Fitzgerald. Released in 1998.

Renowned flute and saxophone player Dave Fitzgerald was a founding member of Iona, but left to pursue classical music studies. After completing his master's degree in music he began recording collaborative projects with fellow musicians, revealing his love of the liturgical tradition. Teaming up with fellow ex-Iona member Dave Bainbridge (guitar, keyboard), and using wind and reed instruments as voices, together they provide a meditative backdrop for the reading of poetry by Anglican Canon Dave Adam. The theme of Adam's work, rooted in Celtic spirituality, is awareness of God's presence in the mundane affairs of everyday life.

Track listing
 "Open My Eyes"  – 6:14
 "Fire And Water"  – 4:03
 "Hymn Of The Universe"  – 8:32
 "Though The Dawn Breaks"  – 4:18
 "Upon A Path Of Light"  – 2:11
 "A Further Shore"  – 4:54
 "I Arise Today (Through The Strength Of Heaven)"  – 2:34
 "The Lightener Of The Stars"  – 3:59
 "On The Wings Of The Morning"  – 5:45
 "King Of Moon, Sun And Stars"  – 7:19
 "Caim"  – 1:59
 "A World Within A World  – 10:52

Personnel

Band
Dave Bainbridge - Keyboards, Piano, Acoustic and Electric Guitars, Bouzouki, Star Bells, Indian Bells, Vocal and Choral arrangements
Dave Fitzgerald - Soprano, Alto and Tenor Saxophones, Flute, Chinese Flutes, Irish Whistles, Flageolet
Máire Brennan - Vocals
Shona MacDonnald - Vocals
Scott Farrell - St. Edmundsbury Cathedral Organ
St. Edmundsbury Boys Choir - Choir
David Adam - Poetry and Narration (on the narrated version only)

Recording details
Cambridge House, Lindisfarne, Northumberland, England
Millennium Studio, Scotland
Castle Sound, Scotland
Visions of Albion, Yorkshire, England
St. Edmundsbury Cathedral, Suffolk, England

Release Details
1998, UK, Kingsway Music KMCD2152, Release Date ?? 1998, CD (with narration by David Adam)
1998, UK, Kingsway Music KMC2152, Release Date ?? 1998, Cassette (with narration by David Adam)
1998, UK, Kingsway Music ?, Release Date ?? 1998, CD (without narration)
2000, USA, Rhythm House Records RHR ?, Release Date ?? 2000, CD (with narration by David Adam)

1998 albums
Dave Fitzgerald albums